Tacumshin Lake is a lake in Tacumshane, in the southeast of County Wexford, Ireland. It is designated as a Special Protection Area (SPA) under the EU Bird Directive (EC/79/409) and a Special Area of Conservation by the National Parks and Wildlife Services.

Tachumshin Lake is a favourite with bird watchers. It attracts some rare American waders in Autumn, as well as internationally important concentrations of Bewick's swans, Brent geese, wigeon, oystercatchers, golden plover and lapwing.

See also
 List of loughs in Ireland

References

Lakes of County Wexford
Special Areas of Conservation in the Republic of Ireland
Special Protection Areas in the Republic of Ireland